Vijenac is a Croatian literary magazine.

Vijenac can also refer to:

 Vijenac, Montenegro, a village near Pljevlja
 Vijenac (Lukavac), a village in Bosnia and Herzegovina
 Vijenac Lake, a lake in Bosnia and Herzegovina
 Vijenac (mountain), a mountain in Bosnia and Herzegovina

See also
 Gorski Vijenac